Badula reticulata is a species of plant in the family Primulaceae. It is endemic to Mauritius.

References

reticulata
Endemic flora of Mauritius
Critically endangered plants
Taxonomy articles created by Polbot